Little Waitress  is a 1932 British musical film directed by Widgey R. Newman and starring Claude Bailey and Moore Marriott. It was made at Bushey Studios as a quota quickie. A romance occurs between an impoverished tourist and a surprisingly wealthy Germany waitress.

Cast
 Claude Bailey as John Farrell  
 Noel Birkin as Student  
 Elvi Keene as Trudi  
 Moore Marriott as Baron Halfsburg 
 Ian Wilson

References

Bibliography
 Chibnall, Steve. Quota Quickies: The Birth of the British 'B' Film. British Film Institute, 2007.
 Low, Rachael. Filmmaking in 1930s Britain. George Allen & Unwin, 1985.
 Wood, Linda. British Films, 1927-1939. British Film Institute, 1986.

External links

1932 films
British musical films
1932 musical films
Films directed by Widgey R. Newman
Quota quickies
Bushey Studios films
British black-and-white films
1930s English-language films
1930s British films